Charles-Georges Fenouillot de Falbaire de Quingey (16 July 1727 – 28 October 1800) was an 18th-century French playwright.

Works 
Theatre
L'Honnête Criminel, ou l'Amour filial, drama in 5 acts and in verse, published in 1767 and given in Paris, by M. de Villeroy, Comédiens français, 2 February 1768 ; Paris, Théâtre de la Cour, Comédiens ordinaires du Roi, 10 July 1769. Read online
Les Deux Avares, comédie en 2 actes, mêlée d'ariettes, Fontainebleau, in front of His Majesty, 27 October and 7 November 1770 ; Paris, Comédie Italienne, 6 December 1770
Les Jammabos, ou Les moines japonois, tragédie dédiée aux mânes de Henri IV, et suivie de remarques historiques (1779) Read online
Le Fabricant de Londres, drame en 5 actes et en prose, Paris, Comédie-Française, 12 January 1771
Sémire et Mélide ou le Navigateur, Brussels, Grand Théâtre de la Monnaie, 27 September 1773 
L'École des mœurs, ou les Suites du libertinage, drame en 5 actes et en vers, Paris, Comédie-Française, 13 May 1776
L'Honnête Homme, ou L'Innocence reconnue, drame en cinq actes & en vers (1790) Read online
Varia
Avis aux gens de lettres contre les prétensions des libraires (1770) Read online
Œuvres de M. de Falbaire de Quingey (2 volumes, 1787)
La Rencontre d'auberge, ou le déjeuner breton (1789)
Mémoire adressé au Roi et à l'Assemblée nationale, sur quelques abus et particulièrement contre une vexation de M. Doüet de La Boullaye (1789)
Mémoire de l'auteur de l'Honnête criminel contre les Comédiens français ordinaires du roi, suivi de la délibération du comité des auteurs dramatiques (1790)
Lettre adressée le 3 septembre 1790 à M. Necker, et suivie de quelques réflexions, tant sur sa retraite que sur la continuation de l'existence ministérielle de M. Lambert, encore à présent contrôleur général des finances (1790)

External links 
 His plays on CÉSAR
 Portrait of Charles-Georges Fenouillot de Falbaire de Quingey
 Fenouillot de Falbaire M., Charles-Georges (1727-1800), Thesaurus, Consortium of European Research Libraries (CERL)

18th-century French dramatists and playwrights
Contributors to the Encyclopédie (1751–1772)
1727 births 
1800 deaths